Pann Pan Lyet Par is a 1963 Burmese black-and-white drama film, directed by Chit Khin starring Kawleikgyin Ne Win, Myat Lay, Kyi Kyi Htay and Baby Nwet.
 It was based on the popular novel Pann Pan Lyet Par, written by Khin Hnin Yu.

Cast
Kawleikgyin Ne Win as Saw Htun
Myat Lay as Kyaw Sein
Kyi Kyi Htay as Ma Baydar
Baby Nwet as Khin Ma Ma

References

1963 films
1960s Burmese-language films
Films shot in Myanmar
Burmese black-and-white films
1963 drama films
Burmese drama films